The Alta Vista Terrace District is a historic district in the Lake View community of Chicago, Illinois.  The district was built in 1904 in imitation of the rowhouse style of London.

The development was the work of Samuel Gross, who was responsible for several other real estate developments in Chicago.  He was inspired to build Alta Vista Terrace after a trip to Europe, in which he looked at the row houses of London. The street is one block long and contains 40 small, single-family rowhouses, each on a lot about 24 feet wide and 40 feet deep.  There were 20 different exterior styles based on various adaptations of architectural styles.  Some of the features included Doric and Ionic wood pilasters, Gothic arches, Palladian windows, stained and leaded-glass fanlights, bay and bow windows, and various decorative woodwork.

Alta Vista Terrace is found at 1050 West on the Chicago street grid, running north from Grace Street (3800 North) to Byron Street (3900 North).

References

External links
 Chicago Landmarks

Historic districts in Chicago
Houses on the National Register of Historic Places in Chicago
Historic districts on the National Register of Historic Places in Illinois
Chicago Landmarks